MiMA, a stylized abbreviation of "Middle of Manhattan", is a mixed-use building located at 450 West 42nd Street between Dyer and 10th Avenues in the Hell's Kitchen neighborhood of Manhattan, New York City.  Ground was broken in 2007 and topping out occurred in early August 2010. It was designed by the Miami-based architecture firm of Arquitectonica, and has 43 floors of luxury rentals on floors 7 to 50, twelve floors of condominiums on floors 51 to 63, and a Yotel hotel on the lower levels. At 638 feet (194 m), it is the 101st tallest building in New York.

The building was developed by The Related Companies and Stephen M. Ross, the company's founder, chairman and CEO, stated that the project "has been well received because of the amenity package...", which includes a private health club, an outdoor movie theatre, and Dog City, a dog run and full pet spa.  MiMA is also one of the first buildings to have a distribution antenna system which improves cell phone service and reception throughout the building.

In 2012, the Signature Theatre Company opened The Pershing Square Signature Center, designed by Frank Gehry, inside the MiMA Building. The center consists of three theatre spaces, two studios, a shared lobby with a café and bar, bookshop, and concierge desk, and administrative offices that span 70,000 contiguous square feet.

In 2022 The UPS Store opened on the W 42nd street retail section to serve the residence and the community.  The UPS Store provides the building a shipping center as well as a business center allowing residence and locals to cover all their printing needs.

2022 saw the Nicol Squash open on the W 42nd street retail section. Nicol Squash is an indoor squash court with 5 full size squash courts.  Nicol Squash offers squash courts and lessons for adults and children.  Nicol Squash also offers squash camp for kids as well as parties for all ages. 

MiMA's advertising campaign, carried out primarily on ads on bus shelters, suggested that "MiMA" was yet another Manhattan neighborhood acronym, like SoHo and TriBeCa.

See also 
 List of tallest buildings in New York City

References

External links 

Residential skyscrapers in Manhattan
Condominiums and housing cooperatives in Manhattan
Postmodern architecture in the United States
Hell's Kitchen, Manhattan
42nd Street (Manhattan)
Residential buildings completed in 2011
Buildings developed by the Related Companies
2011 establishments in New York City
Arquitectonica buildings